Heino von Rantzau (8 March 1894 – 2 November 1946) was a highly decorated Generalleutnant in the Luftwaffe during World War II. He was also a recipient of the Knight's Cross of the Iron Cross. Heino von Rantzau was captured by American troops in April 1945, and died in captivity on 2 November 1946.

Awards and decorations
 Iron Cross (1914)
 2nd Class
 1st Class
 Wound Badge (1914)
 in Black
 Hanseatic Cross of Hamburg
 Military Merit Cross, 1st and 2nd class (Mecklenburg-Schwerin)
 Honour Cross of the World War 1914/1918
 Iron Cross (1939)
 2nd Class (17 May 1940)
 1st Class (28 July 1940)
 Eastern Front Medal
 Anti-Aircraft Flak Battle Badge
 German Cross in Gold (24 December 1942)
 Knight's Cross of the Iron Cross on 29 August 1943 as Generalleutnant and commander of  2. Flak-Division (mot.)

References

Citations

Bibliography

External links

TracesOfWar.com

1894 births
1946 deaths
Military personnel from Karlsruhe
People from the Grand Duchy of Baden
German Army personnel of World War I
Luftwaffe World War II generals
Recipients of the clasp to the Iron Cross, 1st class
Recipients of the Gold German Cross
Recipients of the Knight's Cross of the Iron Cross
Recipients of the Military Merit Cross (Mecklenburg-Schwerin), 1st class
Prisoners who died in United States military detention
German people who died in prison custody
German prisoners of war in World War II held by the United States
Lieutenant generals of the Luftwaffe
Reichswehr personnel
Heino